NGC 807 is an elliptical galaxy located in the constellation Triangulum. It is listed as part of the New General Catalogue (NGC) of astronomical objects. It was discovered by the astronomer William Herschel on September 11, 1784.

References 

Elliptical galaxies
0807
Triangulum (constellation)
007934